Kerang is a city in Victoria, Australia.

It may also refer to:

Kerrang!, British rock and heavy metal magazine
Kerang Village, a village in Arunachal Pradesh, India
Kerang railway station, a railway station in the Piangil line in Victoria, Australia

See also
KeRanger, a ransomware trojan horse, targeting computers running on macOS
Kerangas forest, a type of tropical moist forest found in Borneo island and on Indonesian Belitung and Bangka islands west of Borneo